Subterranean New York City relates to the area beneath the surface level of New York City; the natural features, man-made structures, spaces, objects, and cultural creation and experience. Like other subterranea (geography) the underground world of New York City has been the basis of tv series, documentaries, artwork and books.

History 
Streams, springs and swamps were once a more prominent feature in New York City (NYC). Manhattan for instance has numerous tidally-affected streams that run beneath street level, their existence sub-surface due to development. An example is the Minetta Brook which exists beneath Minetta Lane in Greenwich Village. Water seepage is a problem in the underground spaces of NYC and pumping is necessary to divert it elsewhere. The predominant bedrock underneath NYC is Manhattan Schist.

Some subterranean spaces of New York city are inhabited by so-called Mole people. They were the subject of a 2008 documentary called Voices in the Tunnels.

Municipal services continued to develop and NYC has an extensive sewerage system, steam lines, water channels and other utility systems; and a vast and sometimes deep network of underground space and passages. The workers who excavate this realm are called 'sandhogs' and their origin as an organized group goes back to 8 May 1872. Relics of the past exist beneath the surface, and engineering services have claimed to unearth the likes of old trolley tracks that exist beneath the tarmac and the pneumatic systems of the United States Treasury Department and United States Post Office; the latter of which went into service in 1872 was used for mail delivery.

Pop Culture and art
The underground world of New York City has been the subject of tv series, films, paintings and books. In the popular fictional tv series Teenage Mutant Ninja Turtles, the sewer system was their home and means of navigating swiftly underneath the sprawling city above. Books involving the topic include The Underland Chronicles, Downsiders, Visages Immobiles and the Marvel comic series Morlocks.

As an artistic subject, the NYC Subway was painted by Mark Rothko in his 'subway series', with expression of the architectural elements and space, in contrast to the scenes depicted in the book Manhattan Transfer by Don Passo which detail the hustle and bustle of people. Graffiti artists have used NYC's sub-terranea and associated objects as the canvas itself, painting and writing on subways and trains. NYC in the 1970's and 1980's is regularly considered the height of subway art.

The abandoned Cobble Hill railroad tunnel was the subject of a segment on an episode of the U.S History Channel's Cities of the Underworld.

In the late 1990's, following on from an article about the subject, the  National Geographic created a feature on their website where users could digitally explore elements of subterranean NYC.

Flora and fauna 
New York Sewer Alligator

Public transport

Rail 
New York City Subway
Park Avenue main line
East Side Access
Freedom Tunnel

Road 
Holland Tunnel

Municipal services 
Croton Aqueduct

See also 
Underground city
Subterranean fiction
Subterranean London

References

Sources 

New York City infrastructure
New York City in popular culture
Subterranea (geography)